Barrington Township is one of 29 townships in Cook County, Illinois, USA.  As of the 2010 census, its population was 15,636. The northwestern corner of the Cook County panhandle, it is the county's northwesternmost township. It is also by far the least densely populated township in the county, with less than half the population density of the next least Lemont Township.

Barrington Township was named after the town of Great Barrington, Massachusetts.

Geography

Cities, towns, villages
 Barrington (mostly)
 Barrington Hills (south three-quarters)
 East Dundee (part)
 Hoffman Estates (part)
 Inverness (west quarter)
 South Barrington

Unincorporated Towns
 Barrington Center at 
 Middlebury at 
 Sutton at

Cemeteries
The township contains two historic cemeteries: Barrington Center and Union.

Major highways
  Interstate 90
  U.S. Route 14
  Illinois Route 59
  Illinois Route 62
  Illinois Route 68
  Illinois Route 72

Airports and landing strips
 Allstate Commercial Plaza Heliport
 Mill Rose Farm RLA Airport
 Rose Number 2 Heliport

Lakes
 Beverly Lake
 Crabtree Lake
 Dana Lake
 Goose Lake
 Hawley Lake
 Hawthorne Lake
 Heather Lake
 Keene Lake
 Lacey Lake
 Mirror Lake
 Mud Lake
 Spring Lake
 Stephanie Lake

Landmarks
 Barrington Forest Preserve (west quarter)
 Cook County-Potawatomi Woods Forest Preserve
 Crabtree Nature Center (Cook County Forest Preserve)
 Prairie Stone Business Park

Demographics

School districts
 Barrington Community Unit School District 220
 Community Unit School District 300
 School District 46

Political districts
 Illinois's 6th congressional district
 State House District 52
 State House District 54
 State Senate District 26
 State Senate District 27

References

 
 United States Census Bureau 2007 TIGER/Line Shapefiles
 United States National Atlas

External links
 Barrington Township official website
 City-Data.com
 Illinois State Archives
 Township Officials of Illinois
 Cook County official website

Townships in Cook County, Illinois
Townships in Illinois